The following is a list of notable individuals who converted to Anglicanism from a different religion or no religion.

Formerly  Irreligious 
Phillip Blond, English political philosopher
Karl Dallas, British journalist, folk musician, peace activist
Tamsin Greig, British actress
Nicky Gumbel, priest, developer of Alpha course
Geri Halliwell,  Ginger Spice, singer, songwriter, and actress
Peter Hitchens, columnist, commentator, and journalist; brother of the anti-theist writer Christopher Hitchens
C. E. M. Joad, English philosopher
Alister McGrath, biochemist, historian, scientist, Christian apologist
C. S. Lewis, Oxford professor, writer, Christian apologist
Michael Reiss, British bioethicist, educator, journalist, and priest
Fay Weldon, British novelist and playwright

Formerly  Buddhist 
Ivan Lee, Australian bishop
Kanishka Raffel, Anglican Archbishop of Sydney

Formerly  Catholic 
Madeleine Albright, U.S. Secretary of State
Pete Buttigieg, American politician, U.S. Secretary of Transportation
Miriam Byrne,  Scottish priest, former Roman Catholic nun
James Francis Byrnes, American politician, U.S. Secretary of State, governor of South Carolina
Alice Callaghan, priest, former Roman Catholic nun
Robert Corrigan, Irish-Canadian settler and farmer
Thomas Cranmer, Archbishop of Canterbury, English Reformer
Alberto Cutié, television and radio host, priest
Tim Dlugos, American poet
John Donne, English poet and priest
Dermot Dunne, Dean of Christ Church, Dublin
Matthew Fox, scholar, priest, former Dominican friar
Bernard Kenny, American politician, president of the New Jersey Senate
Joanna Manning, priest, author, feminist, former Roman Catholic nun
Jim McGreevey, Governor of New Jersey
Emmanuel Amand de Mendieta, Belgian Benedictine scholar,  Anglican priest, former  Catholic priest and monk
Thomas Nast, political cartoonist
Autumn Phillips, former wife of Peter Phillips
Katharine Jefferts Schori, first woman primate in the Anglican Communion

Formerly  Hindu 
Santosh Marray, Bishop of the Episcopal Diocese of Easton
Pandita Ramabai, Indian social reformer, scholar
Gabriel Sharma, Bishop of Viti Levu West, Fiji

Formerly  Jewish 
Robert Adley, British politician
Michael Solomon Alexander, first  Anglican Bishop of Jerusalem
Joy Davidman, wife of C. S. Lewis; poet
Alfred Edersheim, Biblical scholar, author
Giles Fraser, priest
Hugh Montefiore, Bishop of Birmingham
Ernest Oppenheimer, mining entrepreneur, financier and philanthropist
Samuel Isaac Joseph Schereschewsky,  Bishop of Shanghai, founder of Saint John's University, Shanghai, Bible translator
Mordechai Vanunu,  Israeli former nuclear technician, nuclear whistleblower, peace activist
Lauren Winner, historian, scholar of religion, priest

Formerly  Mormon 
Carrie Sheffield, American columnist, broadcaster and policy analyst

Formerly  Muslim 
Parveen Babi, Indian actress, model
Barkatullah, Archdeacon and Christian apologist
Hassan Dehqani-Tafti, Bishop of the Diocese of Iran
Dean Mahomed, Indian traveler, writer, surgeon, and entrepreneur
Abdul Masih, Indian indigenous missionary, writer, and minister

Formerly  Orthodox 
Prince  Philip,  Duke of Edinburgh, husband of Queen Elizabeth II

Formerly another branch of Protestantism 
T. S. Eliot, American-born British poet, playwright, and critic, formerly a Unitarian
Enmegahbowh, Native American priest and missionary
Queen Emma of Hawaii, queen of Hawaii
Austin Farrer, philosopher, theologian, and biblical scholar, formerly a Baptist
Emily Ford, artist, feminist, former a Quaker
 Kim Jackson, priest, American politician, first openly LGBTQ+ state senator from Georgia, formerly a Baptist
Don Edward Johnson, Bishop of the  Diocese of West Tennessee, formerly a Baptist
King Kamehameha IV, king of Hawaii
Queen Liliʻuokalani, last sovereign monarch of the Hawaiian Kingdom
Meghan Markle, Duchess of Sussex, American actress, and humanitarian
John Newton, priest, slavery abolitionist, hymnwriter, author of Amazing Grace
Rupert Sheldrake, English biochemist, author, formerly a Methodist
Margaret Thatcher, UK prime minister, formerly a Methodist
Morris King Thompson, Bishop of the  Diocese of Louisiana, formerly a Baptist and Presbyterian

Formerly Other Religions 
Samuel Ajayi Crowther, linguist, clergyman, and first African Anglican bishop in West Africa
Thomas Davis, Mohawk war chief
King  Kyebambe III, king of  Toro
Magema Magwaza Fuze, author of the first book in the Zulu language published by a native speaker
 Manteo, Croatan tribe member, first Native American to convert to Anglicanism
Spokane Garry, Middle Spokane tribal leader

References

 
Converts
Anglicanism